Ziyoda O’tkirovna Qobilova (born 7 January 1989), most commonly known by her stage name Ziyoda, is a popular Uzbek singer, actress and honored artist of Uzbekistan. She sings in Uzbek, Hindi and Persian. She has also become famous outside of Uzbekistan thanks to a cover of Ruslana's song Wild Dances. Ziyoda has also acted in a number of Uzbek drama films.

Life 
Ziyoda O’tkirovna Qobilova was born on January 7, 1989, in Tashkent. While her official birth year is 1989, other sources claim it is 1987. Her brother is named Asadbek and her sister Aziza. 

Later on, she married a man named Eldor, and had a son by the name of Komron by him.

Career

Music career 
Ziyoda rose to stardom in Uzbekistan for the first time with the song "Sevmaganman", a cover of Ruslana's Wild Dances, in 2004. Her debut album was released in Uzbekistan in 2008. Her music has been described as "a flawless and modern mix between Central-Asia, Arabia and the Western world." In 2007, Ziyoda was voted the best female singer of the year in Uzbekistan.

Music videos

Filmography

Actress

References

External links 
 Ziyoda on Last.fm
 Interview with Ziyoa 
  
  
 Ziyoda

1989 births
Living people
Actors from Tashkent
Uzbekistani film actresses
21st-century Uzbekistani women singers
21st-century Uzbekistani actresses
Hindi-language singers
Persian-language singers
Musicians from Tashkent